Kangding, also called Tachienlu and Dartsedo, is a county-level city and the seat of Garzê Tibetan Autonomous Prefecture in Sichuan province of Southwest China. Kangding is on the bank of the Dadu River and has been considered the historical border between the Kham region of Tibet and the Sichuan region. Kangding's urban center is called Lucheng, which has around 134,000 inhabitants.

Names
Historically, the urban center was known by Chinese as Dajianlu (written also as  Tachienlu or Tatsienlu) from the Chinese transliteration of the Tibetan name Dartsedo or Darzêdo.

History
Kangding was on the historical border between Tibet and the rest of China, from Kangding to the west lies Tibetan civilization where as to the east Han cultural areas; It was the capital of the Kingdom of Chakla. During its history, Kangding has witnessed many conflicts between Tibetan and Han polities. Kangding was for many centuries an important trading city where Han brick tea was carried by porters from Chengdu and other centres to trade for Tibetan wool. A dispute involving the sovereignty over the city between Tibet and the Qing was resolved when the Manchu forces took the city by storm in the Battle of Dartsedo in 1701.

On July 1, 1786 an earthquake of 7.75 on the Moment magnitude scale ruined nearly the entire city.

"Tachienlu is surely sui generis; there can be no other town quite like it. Situated eight thousand four hundred feet above the sea, it seems to lie at the bottom of a well, the surrounding snow-capped mountains towering perhaps fifteen thousand feet in the air above the little town which, small as it is, has hardly room to stand, while outside the wall there is scarcely a foot of level ground. It is wedged into the angle where three valleys come together, the Tar and the Chen rivers meeting just below the town to form the Tarchendo, and our first view of the place as we turned the cliff corner that here bars the gorge, was very striking, grey walls and curly roofs standing out sharply from the flanking hillsides."

The city was renamed 'Kangding' in 1904. The American author Dorris Shelton Still, author of "Sue in Tibet", was born here.

During time of the Republic of China administration, Kangding was the capital of the now-defunct province of Xikang.

Dartsedo had a "reform through labor" prison or laogai after 1959. Jasper Becker in Hungry Ghosts: Mao's Secret Famine wrote, "The highest death rate was probably experienced by the Tibetans imprisoned after the abortive revolt of 1959. One survivor, Ama Adhe, describes in A Strange Liberation: Tibetan Lives in Chinese Hands what happened at the Dartsedo camp bordering Sichuan. By the roadside the authorities opened a mass grave which was filled with corpses and gave off a terrible stench. 'Every day,' she recalls, 'they would deliver nine or ten truck loads of bodies to put there...' Of the 300 women arrested with her, only 100 survived."

Climate
Kangding has a monsoon-influenced climate, lying in the transition between a humid continental (Dwb) and a subtropical highland climate (Cwb) on the Köppen system. From April to September, rain is a very common occurrence, with around two-thirds of the days receiving some rainfall; in addition, 77% of the annual precipitation is delivered from May to September. Over the course of the year, the frost-free period lasts 177 days and there are 1,738 hours of sunshine. The highest temperature ever recorded in Kangding was a high temperature record of  measured on March 30, 2007.

Administrative divisions
Kangding is divided into three towns and 18 townships:

Lucheng 
Guzan 
Xinduqiao 
Yala 
Shiji 
Qianxi 
Shelian 
Maibeng 
Sanhe 
Jintang 
Pengta 
Shade 
Gonggashan 
Pusharong 
Jiju Township 
Waze Township 
Xiaba 
Jiagenba 
Pengbuxi 
Tagong 
Kongyu

Description
It is a city populated by significant proportions of both Tibetans and Han, and is part of the historical Tibetan region of Kham. The raging Zheduo River flows through the city, thus the constant sound of water reverberates throughout much of the city. At the north end of Kangding near the bus station the Zheduo River converges with the Yala River. The city features a sizable square, People's Square, where young and old alike gather in the early hours of the morning to do Tai Chi, play badminton, or socialise. This square comes alive on the weekends as well, when families tend to fill it. Traditional Tibetan and Sichuanese restaurants are easily found throughout the city. Dentok, a Tibetan Buddhist monastery sits on the Paoma Mountain overlooking the city, and is accessible by cable car. As of October 2006, a stone amphitheatre is under construction at the upper monastery.

It is a fast-growing city, with a rapidly developing tourist infrastructure, including a scenic cable car imported from Germany.

In 2008 the PRC government opened an airport at Kangding in the province of Sichuan, with a  runway. Since 2013, with the opening of the Daocheng Yading Airport at an elevation 4,411m, Kangding Airport is the third highest in the world.

The folk song Kangding Qingge enjoys popularity throughout China. Since Kangding city was a major town for trading of cloth and tea between Tibetans and Han people. With the increase of trade in Kangding it also attracted more traders with different nationalities creating this culturally diverse city today. Therefore singers also incorporate the music style of Tibet to acknowledge the diversity. 

Kangding contains some notable Buddhist monasteries, including Nanwu Si Monastery, Anjue Monastery and Jinggang Monastery.

It was from 1857 the see of the Roman Catholic Diocese of Kangding, administered by Paris Foreign Missions Society. The Catholic church was destroyed during the Cultural Revolution and rebuilt in the 1980s. Today it is no longer in use and has been converted to shops and a hotel.

Transport
Kangding Airport
China National Highway 318
 Ya'an–Kangding Section

References

Notes

Bibliography
Dorje, Gyurme (1999). Footprint Tibet Handbook with Bhutan. 2nd Edition. Footprint Handbooks, Bath, England. .
 Forbes, Andrew ; Henley, David (2011). China's Ancient Tea Horse Road. Chiang Mai: Cognoscenti Books. ASIN: B005DQV7Q2
Kendall, Elizabeth (1913). A Wayfarer in China: Impressions of a trip across West China and Mongolia. The Riverside Press, Cambridge. Boston and New York.
Leffman, David, et al. (2005). The Rough Guide to China. 4th Edition. Rough Guides, New York, London, Delhi. .

External links

 
Populated places in the Garzê Tibetan Autonomous Prefecture
County-level cities in Sichuan